Hypnotize Minds was an American record label created by DJ Paul and Juicy J of Three 6 Mafia in 1997, in Memphis, Tennessee. The label serves as the successor to Three 6 Mafia's previous label, Prophet Entertainment, which was co-founded by DJ Paul and Juicy J along with Nicholas ‘Nick Scarfo’ Jackson in 1991. Hypnotize Minds was created after DJ Paul and Juicy J had a disagreement with Jackson, which led to Three 6 Mafia and several other artists previously on the Prophet label to move to the new Hypnotize Minds imprint.

As a group act, Hypnotize Minds goes by the stage name Hypnotize Camp Posse. The label has been assumed defunct since 2012 in conjuncture with Three 6 Mafia's hiatus, with the Lil Wyte album Still Doubted? (released on June 19, 2012) being the label's last release.

Notable artists 

DJ Paul (1997-2012) co-owner
Juicy J (1997–2012) co-owner
Lord Infamous (1997-2005) 
Koopsta Knicca (1997-2000) 
Crunchy Black (1997-2006)
Gangsta Boo (1997-2001)
Project Pat (1997-2012)
La Chat (1997-2002)
Indo G (1997-1998)
Mr. Del (1998-2000)
Frayser Boy (2001-2009)
Lil Wyte (2002-2012)
Young Buck (2000)

Discography

References

External links
 Hypnotize Minds on Myspace

1994 establishments in Tennessee
American record labels
Hip hop collectives
Hip hop record labels
Gangsta rap record labels
Horrorcore record labels
Record labels established in 1994
Sony Music
Record labels disestablished in 2012
Record labels based in Tennessee